Memory in FTIsland is a Korean language EP by South Korean band F.T. Island, released on October 10, 2011. The album contains 5 remake songs, the style of which was arranged in a way to suit the band.

Track list

References

2011 EPs
Pop rock albums by South Korean artists
FNC Entertainment EPs
F.T. Island EPs
Korean-language EPs